Mikhail Danilovich Gershkovich (born 1 April 1948) is a retired Soviet football player and a current Russian coach of Jewish ethnicity.

International career
Gershkovich played on the USSR national football team. He made his debut on the team on 16 June 1968 in a friendly against Austria and scored on his debut. He scored a goal in each of his three first games for USSR. He played in the 1970 FIFA World Cup qualifiers, but was not selected for the final tournament squad.

He was also a football coach. He was also President of the Russian Association of Football Coaches.

Honours
 Soviet Top League winner: 1976 (spring)
 Soviet Cup winner: 1968, 1977
 European U-19 Championship winner: 1966

See also
List of select Jewish football (association; soccer) players

References

External links
 Profile 

1948 births
Footballers from Moscow
Living people
Soviet footballers
Association football forwards
Soviet Union international footballers
Soviet Top League players
FC Lokomotiv Moscow players
FC Torpedo Moscow players
FC Dynamo Moscow players
Russian footballers
Jewish footballers